Oreisplanus perornata, the montane sedge-skipper or mountain spotted skipper, is a butterfly of the family Hesperiidae. It is found in the mountains of the Australian states of New South Wales and Victoria.

The wingspan is about 30 mm.

The larvae feed on Gahnia sieberiana. They construct a shelter made from blades of grass curled and joined with silk. It rests in this shelter during the day. Pupation takes place inside the shelter.

External links
Australian Insects
Australian Faunal Directory

Trapezitinae
Butterflies described in 1893
Butterflies of Australia